Osiedle Wrzosy  is a settlement in the administrative district of Gmina Zagnańsk, within Kielce County, Świętokrzyskie Voivodeship, in south-central Poland.

References

Osiedle Wrzosy